Switchback (originally titled "Going West in America") is a 1997 American thriller film written and directed by Jeb Stuart.  It stars Dennis Quaid, Danny Glover, Jared Leto, Ted Levine, William Fichtner and R. Lee Ermey.  An FBI agent tracks his son's kidnapper to Amarillo, Texas, where two lawmen are seeking to use the case in their election bid.

Plot
Late one night, a woman is killed while babysitting a young boy; the killer takes him when he leaves the house. A few months later a man and cleaning woman are killed at a motel in Amarillo, Texas. Amarillo's sheriff, Buck Olmstead, is up for reelection. Both he and his opponent, police chief Jack McGinnis, desire to solve a big murder case before election day. Meanwhile, hitchhiker Lane Dixon is picked up by Bob Goodall, an affable drifter driving a white Cadillac Eldorado.

FBI special agent Frank LaCrosse arrives in Amarillo and tells Olmstead an elusive serial killer is responsible for the murders. Olmstead discovers that LaCrosse has been taken off the case because the kidnapped boy is his son Andy. LaCrosse has a cryptic note from the killer saying that to find his son, he will have to kill him first.  The note includes other clues which are later revealed.  LaCrosse teams up with the reluctant Amarillo sheriff's department to continue his investigation. The tactics of the FBI agent concern Olmstead at first, particularly after finding out LaCrosse's personal conflict. He also worries that cooperating with the suspended FBI agent might cost his own job.

Dixon is suggested as a prime suspect in the murders. But, with LaCrosse on his trail, Goodall reveals himself as the killer. At a mechanics' shop where his car has been repaired, he draws a knife on the mechanic, actually an old friend and former co-worker, because he observes a state trooper checking out the white Cadillac. Unseen by Dixon, he kills his friend to silence the potential witness who could link him to the car. As Goodall and Dixon ride on, building a friendly rapport, Goodall tells the hitchhiker about his son. He asks Dixon to look after the boy if anything happens to him. Dixon agrees, and Goodall gives him the boy's address. The authorities discover the driver of the white Cadillac at the last murder scene fits Dixon's description. No one mentions Goodall. Police roadblocks neglect the mountain roads which are nearly impassable after a blizzard.

Goodall's overconfident driving along the treacherous icy backroads causes the car to careen off the side of a cliff. The car is wedged against a bushy tree on the cliff edge, with Goodall trapped in the driver's seat. Dixon, thrown free in the snow, climbs through the passenger window and cuts Goodall free. Goodall then saves Dixon after the younger man nearly falls to his death retrieving his backpack from the car.

The two men walk to a small town, planning to catch a train west. Dixon overhears men saying that the murderer is driving a white Cadillac. He suspects Goodall, but his suspicions are allayed when newly elected sheriff McGinnis puts out an erroneous radio announcement that the killer has been arrested. The man in custody had Goodall's stolen and abandoned vehicle, and LaCrosse had made a clear point that he was not the killer. Reconciled, Goodall and Dixon catch the train and ride in a car with Tex, another friend of Goodall's. Tex becomes suspicious when Goodall hands him matches from the Amarillo motel where the two murders happened. Goodall kills Tex, proving to Dixon that Goodall is the killer.

LaCrosse lands on top of the moving train. Dixon knocks Goodall down just as LaCrosse enters the railroad car. LaCrosse confronts Dixon, who professes his innocence. Goodall ambushes LaCrosse from behind. They fight until Goodall grabs Dixon, holding a knife at his throat and taunting LaCrosse, who attacks. Goodall cuts Dixon's throat, but not fatally. The fight between LaCrosse and Goodall moves out onto the snow-scraper, a large metal beam on the side of the train.  As the two men battle, hanging onto the beam, Goodall's grip slips. He reminds LaCrosse that he must kill him to locate his son. Goodall drops off the train laughing, tumbling backwards down a snowy slope. As he continues downhill, a fallen tree branch impales and kills him.

LaCrosse grieves, believing that his son is lost forever. He tends to Dixon, who cannot speak since Goodall slit his throat, but he realizes Goodall gave him a clue to the boy's whereabouts and writes in the dust on the floor of the train. LaCrosse goes to that address; he finds his kidnapped son playing in the backyard of a house next door.

Cast
 Dennis Quaid as Special Agent Frank LaCrosse
 Danny Glover as Bob Goodall
 Jared Leto as Dr. Lane Dixon M.D.
 R. Lee Ermey as Sheriff Buck Olmstead
 William Fichtner as Jack McGinnis
 Ted Levine as Deputy Nate Braden
 Walt Goggins as Bud
 Maggie Roswell as Fae
 Allison Smith as Becky
 Julio Oscar Mechoso as Jorge Martinez
 Kevin Cooney as Grant Montgomery
 Leo Burmester as Clyde 'Shorty' Callahan
 Brent Hinkley as Man on Porch

Other
The film's visual effects were designed by veteran studio VIFX/Video Image.  The Denver & Rio Grande Railroad Snowplow AX-044, featured near the end of the film, is listed on the Colorado State Register of Historic Properties and is on permanent display at the Pioneer Village Museum in Hot Sulphur Springs, Colorado.

Reception
The film grossed $6.5 million in the US and had a budget of $38 million.

On Rotten Tomatoes, the film has a 31% rating based on 26 reviews, with an average rating of 4.8/10. The critics consensus reads, "Burdened by its heavy load of digressive plot turns and uneven performances, Switchback never gains any sense of narrative momentum." Audiences polled by CinemaScore gave the film an average grade of "B-" on an A+ to F scale. 

Stephen Holden of The New York Times describes the film as "a disorganized mess". He faults Quaid for being too dour and Glover for being too likable. Both Holden and Roger Ebert praised the film's atmosphere, especially its location shots. Ebert found the setting and the minor characters, like Ermey's sheriff, the most charming parts of the film, concluding, "What we have here is a potentially good movie swamped by the weight of Hollywood formulas it is forced to carry".

References

External links
 
 
 Movie review from the Cincinnati Enquirer

1997 films
1997 crime thriller films
American crime thriller films
American detective films
American serial killer films
Films produced by Gale Anne Hurd
Films produced by Jeb Stuart
Films set in Texas
Films set in New Mexico
Films set in Colorado
Films shot in Colorado
Films shot in California
Films scored by Basil Poledouris
Paramount Pictures films
Films with screenplays by Jeb Stuart
1997 directorial debut films
1990s English-language films
1990s American films